Trident, in comics, may refer to:

Trident Comics, a former publisher of British comic books
Trident (UK comics), an anthology comic book title
Trident (DC Comics), a DC Comics character
Trident Corporation, a fictional corporation in the manga Spriggan

See also
Trident (disambiguation)